In mathematics, specifically topology, a sequence covering map is any of a class of maps between topological spaces whose definitions all somehow relate sequences in the codomain with sequences in the domain. These classes of maps are closely related to sequential spaces. If the domain and/or codomain have certain additional topological properties (often, the spaces being Hausdorff and first-countable is more than enough) then these definitions become equivalent to other well-known classes of maps, such as open maps or quotient maps, for example. In these situations, characterizations of such properties in terms of convergent sequences might provide benefits similar to those provided by, say for instance, the characterization of continuity in terms of sequential continuity or the characterization of compactness in terms of sequential compactness (whenever such characterizations hold).

Definitions

Preliminaries

The set  of all sequentially open subsets of  forms a topology on  that is finer than 's given topology  
By definition,  is called a  if  

Every continuous map is sequentially continuous although in general, the converse may fail to hold. 
In fact, a space  is a sequential space if and only if it has the following : 
for every topological space  and every map  the map  is continuous if and only if it is sequentially continuous. 

Every first-countable space is a Fréchet–Urysohn space and thus also a sequential space. All pseudometrizable spaces, metrizable spaces, and second-countable spaces are first-countable.

Sequence coverings

Statements such as "the sequence  is injective" or "the image (i.e. range)  of a sequence  is infinite" as well as other terminology and notation that is defined for functions can thus be applied to sequences. 
As usual, if  is declared to be (such as by definition) a subsequence of  then it should immediately be assumed that  is strictly increasing. 
The notation  and  mean that the sequence  is valued in the set  

The function  is called a  if for every convergent sequence  in   there exists a sequence  such that  
A map  is a  if for every compact  there exists some compact subset  such that

Sequentially quotient mappings

In analogy with the definition of sequential continuity, a map  is called a  if 

Sequentially quotient maps were introduced in  who defined them as above. 

Every sequentially quotient map is necessarily surjective and sequentially continuous although they may fail to be continuous. 

Call a space   if  is a Hausdorff space. 
In an analogous manner, a "sequential version" of every other separation axiom can be defined in terms of whether or not the space  possess it. 
Every Hausdorff space is necessarily sequentially Hausdorff. A sequential space is Hausdorff if and only if it is sequentially Hausdorff. 

If  is a sequentially continuous surjection then assuming that  is sequentially Hausdorff, the following are equivalent:

 is sequentially quotient.
Whenever  is a convergent sequence in  then there exists a convergent sequence  in  such that  is a subsequence of 
 This statement differs from (2) above only in that there are no requirements placed on the limits of the sequences (which becomes an important difference only when  is not sequentially Hausdorff). 
 If  is a continuous surjection onto a sequentially compact space  then this condition holds even if  is not sequentially Hausdorff.

If the assumption that  is sequentially Hausdorff were to be removed, then statement (2) would still imply the other two statement but the above characterization would no longer be guaranteed to hold (however, if points in the codomain were required to be sequentially closed then any sequentially quotient map would necessarily satisfy condition (3)). 
Instead of using the original definition, some authors define "sequentially quotient map" to mean a  surjection that satisfies condition (2) or alternatively, condition (3). If the codomain is sequentially Hausdorff then these definitions differs from the original  in the added requirement of continuity (rather than merely requiring sequential continuity).

The map  is called  if for every convergent sequence  in  such that  is not eventually equal to  the set  is  sequentially closed in  where this set may also be described as:
 
Equivalently,  is presequential if and only if for every convergent sequence  in  such that  the set  is  sequentially closed in 

A surjective map  between Hausdorff spaces is sequentially quotient if and only if it is sequentially continuous and a presequential map.

Characterizations

If  is a continuous surjection between two first-countable Hausdorff spaces then the following statements are true: 
 is almost open if and only if it is a 1-sequence covering.
 is an open map if and only if it is a 2-sequence covering.
If  is a compact covering map then  is a quotient map.
The following are equivalent:
 is a quotient map.
 is a sequentially quotient map.
 is a sequence covering.
 is a pseudo-open map.
 is a hereditarily quotient map.

Properties

The following is a sufficient condition for a continuous surjection to be sequentially open, which with additional assumptions, results in a characterization of open maps.

Assume that  is a continuous map between two Hausdorff first-countable spaces and let  
If there exists a sequence  in  such that (1)  and (2) there exists some  such that  is  locally finite at  then  

Sufficient conditions

The following shows that under certain conditions, a map's fiber being a countable set is enough to guarantee the existence of a point of openness. If  is a sequence covering from a Hausdorff sequential space  onto a Hausdorff first-countable space  and if  is such that the fiber  is a countable set, then there exists some  such that  is a point of openness for  

See also

Notes

Citations

References

  
  
  
  
  
  
  
  
  
  
  
  
  
  

Topological graph theory